Styled to Rock may refer to:

 Styled to Rock (UK TV series), 2012.
 Styled to Rock (US TV series), 2013
 Styled to Rock Asia, 2016
 Styled to Rock Vietnam, 2016